Eucalybites aureola is a moth of the family Gracillariidae. It is known from Hokkaidō island of Japan and the Kuril Islands.

The wingspan is 8-10.2 mm.

The larvae feed on Hypericum erectum. They mine the leaves of their host plant. The larva is a leaf miner in early instars, and a leaf-roller in later instars. The mine is of a small tentiform type and is found on the lower side of the leaf. The leaf roll is cone-shaped and rolled up downward from the tip of the leaf. When the larva makes the cone, it does not cut off the leaf into a narrow stripe. The cocoon is situated on the lower surface of the leaf, usually on the mid rib near the tip. It is boat shaped.

References

Gracillariinae
Moths of Japan